The 2015 Utah State Aggies football team represented Utah State University in the 2015 NCAA Division I FBS football season. The Aggies were led by third-year head coach Matt Wells and played their home games at Merlin Olsen Field at Maverik Stadium. This was Utah State's third season as members of the Mountain West Conference in the Mountain Division. They finished the season 6–7, 5–3 in Mountain West play to finish in a four-way tie for second place in the Mountain Division. They were invited to the Famous Idaho Potato Bowl where they lost to Akron.

Before the season

2015 recruits

Departures
The Aggies lost both their Defensive and Offensive coordinators (DC Todd Orlando to Houston and OC Kevin McGiven to Oregon State)

Among notable player losses to graduation were S Brian Suite, LB Zach Vigil, DE B.J. Larsen, WR Ronald Butler, and OL Kevin Whimpey. Another notable loss was QB Darrel Garretson announcing that he would be transferring to Oregon State University.

On June 29, it was announced that Bruce "JoJo" Natson was released from the team for violation of unspecified team rules.

Maverik Stadium upgrades
On May 18, 2015, demolition began on the west side of Maverik Stadium to make way for a new concourse, press box, and luxury box complex. Construction lasted throughout the season, and as a result, the stadium's capacity was temporarily reduced.

Roster

Schedule

Schedule Source:

Game summaries

Southern Utah

at Utah

at Washington

Colorado State

at Fresno State

Boise State

The Aggies' victory over the Broncos marked not only the first win over Boise State since 1997, but also the first home victory over a ranked opponent since defeating Fresno State in 1991.

at San Diego State

Wyoming

at New Mexico

at Air Force

Nevada

BYU

Akron–Famous Idaho Potato Bowl

References

Utah State
Utah State Aggies football seasons
Utah State Aggies football